ACS Fortuna Becicherecu Mic, commonly known as Fortuna Becicherecu Mic, is a Romanian women's football club based in Becicherecu Mic, Timiș County, Romania. The team currently plays in the Liga I, first tier of the Romanian women's football system, after promoting at the end of the 2016–17 season.

History
Fortuna Becicherecu Mic was founded in 2015 as a women's squad of CS Nuova Mama Mia Becicherecu Mic. However, after just one season of its inception, in the summer of 2016 when Nuova Mama Mia moved from Becicherecu Mic, a new entity (a club that includes also a male football team) was formed and took over the women's team including all of the players and staff, the equipment and the sports facilities under the name of ACS Fortuna Becicherecu Mic, thus insuring the continuity of the team under a new name. For this reason, the Romanian Football Federation allowed the team to keep its place in the second tier league, even though a third tier was created in 2016.

While still remaining a separate club, in the summer of 2020, ACS Fortuna Becicherecu Mic signed a partnership with ASU Politehnica Timișoara, as a result of which the male Fortuna team became an unofficial satellite of Politehnica's. In contrast, in the summer of 2021, strengthening the partnership between the two clubs, the Fortuna women's team announced that it will use the Politehnica Timișoara branding starting with the 2021–2022 season. As a result of the partnership, since summer 2021 it started using the Stadionul Știința (Baza 1) as its main stadium, but switched playing its games on Politehnica University of Timișoara's Baza 2 from 2022, while the Becicherecu Mic Communal is still used for training matches and some youth games.

Chronology of names

Colors and kits
The colors of the team were red and white from 2015 until 2021, when due to the partnership with SSU Politehnica Timișoara, the team adopted its colors: white and violet.

Honours

Leagues
Liga I
Runners-up (1): 2018–19
Liga II
Runners-up (1): 2016–17

Cups
Romanian Women's Cup
Runners-up (1): 2018–19

Season by season

Current squad

Club officials

Board of directors

 Last updated: 19 January 2019
 Source:

Current technical staff

 Last updated: 19 January 2019
 Source:

References

External links
 ACS Fortuna Becicherecu Mic at fotbalfeminin.net
 

Women's football clubs in Romania
Football clubs in Timiș County
Sport in Timișoara
Association football clubs established in 2015
2015 establishments in Romania